Yoshiko Sembon (born November 6, 1928) is a Japanese screenwriter and director.

Biography
Yoshiko Sembon was born November 6, 1928, in the Manchuria region of China. When she was nine, Sembon returned to Japan with her family and settled down in Tateyama, Chiba. Her family moved to Tokyo after World War II ended. Sembon later entered Waseda University as an acting major. Upon graduating from college in 1953, she began working at the newly created Nippon Television. Since then, she has written and directed numerous television programs.

Sembon's directorial feature-film debut, Red Whale, White Snake, was released on November 25, 2006. The film is about Yoshiko's childhood days in Chiba Prefecture.

External links
Staff biography for Red Whale, White Snake 

1928 births
Japanese film directors
Japanese screenwriters
Japanese women film directors
Japanese women screenwriters
Living people
Waseda University alumni